Natanael Ntolla Thio (born 1 July 1999) is a French professional footballer who plays as a winger for  club Châteauroux.

Professional career
Ntolla made his professional debut with Sochaux  in a 2-1 Coupe de la Ligue loss to Paris FC on 13 August 2019. On 17 January 2020, Ntolla signed his first professional contract with Sochaux.

On 17 June 2021, he signed a three-year contract with Châteauroux.

References

External links
 
 Sochaux Profile

1999 births
Living people
Sportspeople from Argenteuil
French footballers
French sportspeople of Cameroonian descent
Association football wingers
FC Sochaux-Montbéliard players
LB Châteauroux players
Ligue 2 players
Championnat National players
Championnat National 3 players
Footballers from Val-d'Oise